Tony Zhuravel (born 19 March 1963), alternatively known as Anatoly Zhuravel, is a Belarusian contemporary artist. In 1997 he became a member of Belarusian Union of Artists.

Art development 
Tony Zhuravel's painting style incorporates a layering effect. His method interleaves textures, blending color and a subjective atmosphere within her imagery. He paints using unpredictable palettes, a spectrum of color. Indeed, his surprising use of color has become a distinctive attribute of his work. Tony's abstract western landscapes experiment with this concept of the horizon; austere western prairie bonded with a shifting sky. So much more than just a thin line, his imagery reveals the horizon's intricate variety in rich layers and unusual colors. 
All the consequences of an unaffected invention that results from intuitive strokes on the canvas.

Paintings 
In 2009 Tony Zhuravel represented Belarus at Venice Bienalle – The most famous abstract painting in which Zhuravel tapped his potential for freewheeling expressionism is “August”  the most ambitious painting. Tony Zhuravel and Alex Salaueu are prominent representatives of the Vitebsk Art school founded by Marc Chagall and Kazimir Malevich .

Honours 
1992, 1998 - awarded the Grand Prix in the category "Painting and Tapestry" at the exhibition of visual arts "ART-MARK", Moscow. Vitebsk. 1998 - Grand Prix of the Republican exhibition “Time. Space. Personality ". 1998 - First UN Prize in the Sustainable Development of the World nomination.

Collections 
Tony Zhuravel's works are held in the following public collections:

 Belarusian National Arts Museum, Minsk
 The funds of the Belarusian Union of Artists
 Tretyakov Gallery, Moscow
 Museum of Modern Art, Mogilev

Bibliography 

 Anatol Zhuravel // Sayuz creatorў [Vyyaylenchy material] = A Union of creators: photo album / style. і аўт. tekstu M. Tsybulski; aut. ledge. W. Andreichanka; fat. V. Balotsina, M. Tsybulskaga. - Mn. : Belarus, 2005. - P. 50. - To Belarus. і English movah.
 Tsybulsky, M. L. Zhuravlev Anatoly Petrovich / M. L. Tsybulsky // Regions of Belarus: encyclopedia. : in 7 volumes / editorial board: T. V. Belova (chief editor) [and others]. - Mn. : Belarus. Entsykl. Name P. Broeki, 2010. - T. 2: Vitebsk region. Book. 1. - P.432.
 Gatoskaya, L. "Svetabudova Zhuraўlya" / L. Gatuskaya // Arshanskaya newspaper. - 2004 .-- 10 red. - S. 7.
 Kalenik, A. Zhuraўliny susvet / A. Kalenik // Polatsk spring. - 2009 .-- 3 sak. - S. 7.
 Machkova, V. "The Universe of the Crane" / V. Machkova // Telecom Express (Orsha). - 2010 .-- Apr 15. - S. 30.
 Pavlova, E. "March cats" / E. Pavlova // Vitebsk courier. - 2005 .-- March 25. - S. 8.
 Solovyova, T. The Universe of the Crane / T. Solovyova // Vitebsk Prospect. - 2008 .-- Dec 18. - S. 3.
 Fragments of life // Inform Plus (Polotsk). - 2009 .-- Feb 26. - S. 4.

References 

1963 births
Living people
20th-century Belarusian painters
Belarusian male painters
20th-century male artists
People from Orsha
Contemporary painters
Belarusian State Academy of Arts alumni
Male painters